Ghia Nodia (born 1954, USSR) is a Georgian political analyst who served as the Minister of Education and Science in the Cabinet of Georgia from 31 January 2008 until 10 December 2008. 

Nodia graduated from the Department of Philosophy and Psychology at Tbilisi State University (TSU) in 1976 and worked at the Institute of Philosophy of the Georgian Academy of Sciences from 1980 to 2001. He has lectured at the TSU, the Ilia State University, and in the West. Since 1992, he has chaired the Tbilisi-based think-tank Caucasus Institute for Peace, Democracy and Development. He was Minister of Education and Science in 2008. He is currently a director at the International School of Caucasus Studies at the Ilia State University.

References
 Ghia Nodia's article in the Financial Times

1954 births
Political scientists from Georgia (country)
Living people
Government ministers of Georgia (country)